Babiche Roof (born 2 June 1993) is a Dutch footballer who plays for PEC Zwolle.

Honours 
Ajax
Winner
 KNVB Women's Cup: 2013–2014

External links 
 

1993 births
Living people
Dutch women's footballers
AFC Ajax (women) players
Telstar (women's football club) players
Footballers from Almere
FC Utrecht (women) players
Eredivisie (women) players
Women's association football midfielders